The 2017 NCAA Division II men's basketball tournament involved 64 teams playing in a single-elimination tournament to determine the national champion of men's NCAA Division II college basketball. It began March 10, 2017, following the 2016–17 season and concluded with the championship game on March 25, 2017.

The eight regional winners met in the Elite Eight for the quarterfinal, semifinal, and championship rounds. For the first time, the Elite Eight was held at the Sanford Pentagon in Sioux Falls, South Dakota.

 defeated 
71-61, to win the first national championship in the school's history.

Regionals

Atlantic - Fairmont, West Virginia
Location: Joe Retton Arena

* – Denotes overtime period

Central - Maryville, Missouri
Location: Bearcat Arena

* – Denotes overtime period

East - Syracuse, New York
Location: Le Moyne Athletic Center

* – Denotes overtime period

Midwest - Louisville, Kentucky
Location: Knights Hall

South - Huntsville, Alabama
Location: Spragins Hall

* – Denotes overtime period

Southeast - Charlotte, North Carolina
Location: Curry Arena

South Central - Golden, Colorado
Location: Lockridge Arena

* – Denotes overtime period

West - San Diego, California
Location: RIMAC

Elite Eight - Sioux Falls, South Dakota
Location: Sanford Pentagon

References

NCAA Division II men's basketball tournament
Tournament
NCAA Division II basketball tournament
NCAA Division II basketball tournament